Lies, Sissies, and Fiascoes: The Best of This American Life is the second compilation album featuring radio broadcasts from This American Life. The two-disc set contains contributions by Dishwasher Pete, Ira Glass, Jack Hitt, Sandra Tsing Loh, David Sedaris, and Sarah Vowell. The cover was created by Chris Ware.

Track listing
Jack Hitt – Peter Pan – 20:12
David Sedaris – Drama Bug – 11:40
Dishwasher Pete – Letterman! Cookies! – 13:09
Sandra Tsing Loh – Mr. Loh's Not Afraid to Be Naked – 10:08
Cheryl Trykv – Teen Getaway – 12:41
Sarah Vowell – Shooting Dad – 11:06
Ira Glass – Get Over It! – 16:27
Rob Bindler – Hands on a Hard Body – 16:45
Scott Carrier – The Test – 15:34
David Rakoff – Christmas Freud – 15:48
Marissa Bridge – Apology Line – 12:25

See also
Crimebusters + Crossed Wires: Stories from This American Life
This American Life: Hand It Over -- Stories from Our First Year on the Air
Stories of Hope and Fear

External links
This American Life on-line store

This American Life albums
1999 compilation albums
Rhino Entertainment compilation albums